The Ravi River is a transboundary river crossing northwestern India and eastern Pakistan. It is one of five rivers associated with the Punjab region.

Under the Indus Waters Treaty of 1960, the waters of the Ravi and two other rivers were allocated to India. Subsequently, the Indus Basin Project was developed in Pakistan, which transfers waters from western rivers of the Indus system to replenish the portion of the Ravi River lying in that country. Many inter-basin water transfers, irrigation, hydropower and multipurpose projects have been built in India.

History
The Ravi was known as Purushni or Irawati to Indians in Vedic times and as Hydraotes to the Ancient Greeks.

Part of the Battle of the Ten Kings was fought on a river, which according to Yaska (Nirukta 9.26) refers to the Iravati River (Raavi River) in the Punjab.

Geography
The Ravi River, a transboundary river of India and Pakistan, is an integral part of the Indus River Basin and forms the headwaters of the Indus basin. The waters of the Ravi River drain into the Arabian Sea (Indian Ocean) through the Indus River in Pakistan. The river rises in the Bara Bhangal, Kangra District in Himachal Pradesh, India. Flowing westward, it is hemmed by the Pir Panjal and Dhauladhar ranges, forming a triangular zone.

River course
Source reach

The Ravi River originates in the Himalayas in the Multhan tehsil of Kangra district of Himachal Pradesh, India. It follows a north-westerly course and is a perennial river. It flows through Barabhangal, Bara Bansu, and Chamba districts. It flows in rapids in its initial reaches with boulders seen scattered in the bed of the river. It flows through the ancient capital of Bharmwar, now known as Bharmour in Himachal Pradesh. During 1858–1860, the Raja of Bharmour had considered the Budhil valley as an excellent source of Deodar trees for supply to the British Raj. However, a part of the forest surrounding the temple was considered sacred and declared a reserved area. This valley was also exploited for its forest wealth during the English period.

Another major tributary that joins the Ravi River, just below Bharmour, the old capital of Chamba, is the Seul River from the northern direction. The valley formed by the river was also exploited for its rich timber trees. However, the valley has large terraces, which are very fertile and known as "the garden of Chamba". crops grown here supply grains to the capital region and to Dalhousie town and its surrounding areas. One more major tributary that joins the Ravi River near Basohli (J&K) is the Seva. This river was also exploited for its forest resources, (controlled by the then Raja of Chamba) originating from the Jammu region. The valley is also formed by another major tributary that joins the Seul River, the Baira-Nalla. Its sub-basin is in the Chamba district, located above Tissa. Baira drains the southern slopes of the Pir Panjal Range.

Tant Gari is another small tributary that rises from the subsidiary hill ranges of the Pir Panjal Range east of Bharmour. The valley formed by this stream is U-shaped with a river bed scattered with boulders and glacial morainic deposits.

Main Ravi River

The main Ravi River flows through the base of Dalhousie hill, past the Chamba town. It flows into the south-west, near Dalhousie, and then cuts a gorge in the Dhauladhar Range, before entering the Punjab plain near Madhopur and Pathankot. It then flows along the Indo–Pak border for  before entering Pakistan and joining the Chenab River.

The Ujh River is another major tributary of the Ravi River.

As the Ravi flows past Lahore in Pakistan ( below Amritsar in India) it is called "The river of Lahore" since that city is on its eastern bank. After passing through Lahore the river takes a turn at Kamalia and then debouches into the Chenab River, south of the town of Ahmadpur Sial. On its western bank is the town of Shahdara Bagh with the Tomb of Jahangir and the Tomb of Noor Jahan.

 Change of river course
According to satellite imagery studies carried out over a period of 20 years (between 1972–1973 and 1991–1993), the river coursing along the India–Pakistan border meanders substantially in the alluvial plains of the Amritsar, Pathankot, and Gurdaspur districts of Punjab. This has resulted in successive damage in India as a result of the river changing its course towards India. The reason attributed to this change in the course of the river is massive river training structures/bunds constructed by Pakistan in its part of the river, close to the old course of the river. The shift in the course of the river is reported to be  towards India.

 River water pollution

In the transboundary Ravi River flowing from India to Pakistan, in urban areas of Lahore the pollution levels in the river discharge are reportedly very high, which is attributed to careless disposal of large amount of industrial and agricultural wastewater and faulty drainage systems in both countries. A  stretch of the Ravi River from Lahore Siphon to Baloki headworks indicates heavy contamination of the water and sediment with Cd, Cr, Pt, and Cu. The river sediments are highly contaminated and have become a secondary source for pollution of the river water, even though some control over unauthorised discharges into the river have been checked. Hence, measures to check metal re-mobilization from sediments into the river flows need attention. The worst affected drainage is the Hadharaam drain, a tributary of the Ravi River. It is also a trans-border problem involving both India and Pakistan. A UNDP funded special programme was launched in 2006 to address the issue in both countries.

Vegetation

Hydrology

The waters of the Ravi River are allocated to India under the Indus Waters Treaty, signed by India and Pakistan. Within India, the river is under the jurisdiction of the riparian states of Punjab and Himachal, and non-riparian states of Haryana, Jammu & Kashmir, and Rajasthan, but the management is presided by the Supreme Court of India and the Ravi Beas Tribunal, set up in 1986 for the purpose. Most of the water generated below the Madhopur headworks (4.549 MAF) is flowing into Pakistan from India.

Pre-partition utilisation

On the Ravi River, the earliest project built was the Madhopur Headworks, in 1902. It is a run-of-the river project (no storage envisaged) to divert flows through the Upper Bari Doab Canal (also known as Central Bari Doab Canal) to provide irrigation in the command area of the then unified India. Prior to partition, it irrigated 335,000 hectares of land in Gurdaspur, Amritsar and Lahore districts.

Hydropower

The hydropower potential of the Ravi River system has been assessed at 2294 MW, of which only 1638 MW has been harnesses cumulatively, thus leaving 656 MW wasted opportunity. The hydropower potential developed since the 1980s is through installation of Baira Suil Hydroelectric Power Project of 198 MW capacity, the Chamera-I of 540 MW capacity commissioned in 1994, the Ranjitsagar Multipurpose Project of 600 MW capacity completed in 1999 and the Chamera-II of 300 MW capacity in the upstream of Chamera-I commissioned in 2004.

Multipurpose development

The major multipurpose project (irrigation, hydropower, flood control, development of fisheries, tourism and so forth) built on the river is the Ranjit Sagar Dam (also known as Thein dam as it is in Thein village). The left bank is in Punjab and the right bank is in Jammu and Kashmir. The project is an outcome of the development plan conceived for the use of the waters of three eastern rivers allocated to India under the Indus Treaty, namely the Sutlej, the Beas and the Ravi, for irrigation, hydropower generation and other consumptive uses.

A committee later conducted a survey of the area, but it was not until 1954 that geologists fully inspected the project area. In 1957, a storage Dam was proposed on the Ravi River for irrigation purposes only. The power generation aspect was not considered then. It was only in 1964 that the project was conceived for multipurpose development and submitted to Government of India for approval. Finally, in April 1982, the project was approved for construction by the Government of India.

The geomorpohological setting of the river basin, which has a large number of terraces between Dhauladhar and Pir Panjal ranges, is attributed to the truly Himalayan characteristics of the river reflecting the "cis-Himalayan tectonic; structural, lithological and climatic conditions. Obviously it is different from the antecedent Indus and Sutlej".

International water-sharing treaty

The upper reaches of the main Indus River and its tributaries lie in India whereas the lower reaches are in Pakistan. Following the partition of India in August 1947, a dispute arose between India and Pakistan on sharing of the waters of the Indus River Basin. The dispute was resolved with the intervention of the World Bank and a treaty was signed in 1960 on sharing of the Indus waters between India and Pakistan.

The Indus system of rivers comprises the three Western rivers in the Indus, the Jhelum and Chenab together with three eastern rivers: the Sutlej, the Beas, and the Ravi. To establish the ownership of these waters, and Indus Water Treaty was signed between India and Pakistan on 1 April 1960, under the monitoring of the World Bank. The treaty, under Article 5.1, envisages the sharing of waters of the rivers Ravi, Beas, Sutlej, Jhelum, and Chenab which join the Indus River on its left bank (eastern side) in Pakistan. According to this treaty, Ravi, Beas, and Sutlej, which constitute the eastern rivers, are allocated for exclusive use by India before they enter Pakistan. However, a transition period of 10 years was permitted in which India was bound to supply water to Pakistan from these rivers until Pakistan was able to build the canal system for utilisation of waters of Jhelum, Chenab, and the Indus itself, allocated to it under the treaty. Similarly, Pakistan has exclusive use of the western rivers Jhelum, Chenab, and Indus but with some stipulations for the development of projects on these rivers in India. Pakistan also received one-time financial compensation for the loss of water from the eastern rivers. Since 31 March 1970, after the 10-year moratorium, India has secured full rights for use of the waters of the three rivers allocated to it. The treaty resulted in partitioning of the rivers rather than sharing of their waters.

Under this treaty, the two countries also agreed to exchange data and co-operate in matters related to the treaty. For this purpose, the treaty envisaged the creation of the Permanent Indus Commission, with a commissioner appointed by each country. The Indus Waters Treaty is the only international treaty that has been implemented over the last 60 years with due diligence and sincerity by both India and Pakistan, in spite of many wars fought between the two countries (the treaty was not revoked either by India or Pakistan during the 1965 or the 1971 war).

Interstate water dispute
Even prior to the partition of India in August 1947, India had developed projects on the river Ravi and Beas River system. When the treaty was under debate, India had taken advance action to develop the three rivers, which were eventually allocated to it under the treaty. According to a directive of the Government of India, planning for the development of the Ravi and Beas rivers was initiated concurrently with the treaty negotiations, which involved four riparian states of Punjab, PEPSU (this was merged with Punjab and subsequently Punjab was divided, and additionally the Haryana state was created), Himachal Pradesh, Rajasthan and Jammu and Kashmir (J&K) within the ambit of the already developed Bhakra Nangal Dam project on the Sutlej River. A review of the flows in the two river systems revealed that prior to the partition of the country and up to the time of the signing of the Indus Treaty,  of water was used by major irrigation systems such as the Upper Bari Doab Canal System (1959) and the Lower Bari Doab Canal System (1915). However, with the merger of PEPSU with Punjab and subsequent bifurcation of Punjab into two states, a dispute arose on the allocation of Ravi and Beas waters for which a tribunal was set up under the Interstate River Water Disputes Act.

As a counterclaim to the exclusive claims of Punjab, Haryana claims that a small part of Haryana state lying north in Panchkula district is part of the Sutlej river basin area in addition to Punjab and Himachal Pradesh in India. Thus Haryana claims to be a riparian state of the Indus river basin.

Following the reorganisation of the state of Punjab in 1966, Haryana State was created. This was followed by a notification by the Government of India dated 24 March 1976 allocating the surplus waters between Punjab and Haryana in due consideration of the powers conferred by Sub Section (I) of Section 78 of the Punjab Reorganization Act, 1966 (31 of 1966). The allocation was challenged in the Supreme Court by Haryana.

However, the legality of this agreement was challenged by Punjab. This was followed by the Punjab accord signed by the then Prime Minister of India Rajiv Gandhi and Sant Harchand Singh Longowal, President of the Shiromani Akali Dal, on 24 July 1985. This accord stipulated that 

Following the above accord, Ravi & Beas Waters Tribunal (RBWT) came to be set up in April 1986, in pursuance of paragraphs 9.1 & 9.2 of Punjab Settlement (Rajiv-Longowal Accord, 1985) inter-alia to adjudicate the claims of Punjab and Haryana in Ravi-Beas waters. The Terms of Reference were set and also the time for submission of the report. The Tribunal submitted its report on 30 January 1987. However, the report was contested as Rajasthan also moved an application "seeking explanation and guidance regarding the report of this Ravi Beas waters Tribunal, 1987". The Tribunal is further examining the matter. It is yet to submit its further report to the Government on the pleas submitted by the party States and the Central Government also seeking explanation/guidance on its earlier report. In the meantime, a Presidential reference on Punjab Termination of Agreements Act, 2004 is pending before the Honorable Supreme Court. Hence, the further hearings of the Tribunal and its final report are now enjoined on the outcome of the Supreme Court hearing of the Presidential reference. The presently incomplete SYL link canal, to connect the Sutlej and Yamuna rivers to transfer Haryana's share of water, is now stuck in a dispute in the Supreme Court of India due to objections by Punjab.

Punjab is contemplating to construct 206 MW Shahpurkandi dam project hydro electric project on the Ravi River between Ranjitsagar dam and Madhopur head works. This stretch of the river is forming boundary between J & K state and Punjab state. Since Punjab had unilaterally exited from the earlier water sharing agreements, J & K state refused the project construction. Also J & K state is going ahead with the construction of Ravi canal originating from Basantpur to irrigate  of land in Jammu region. This canal would draw river water by pumping the water released downstream from the Rangitsagar reservoir for which J & K state is not required to take consent from Punjab as it is not bound by earlier river water sharing agreements.

Interbasin water transfer
Transfer of surplus water from one basin to another, termed as interbasin water transfer has been effectively implemented on the Ravi River. The surplus waters of the Ravi River have been transferred directly first to the Beas River through the Ravi-Beas Link. A further link from the Beas River to the Sutlej River by the Beas Sutlej Link augments storage of the Bhakra reservoir in India.

See also

 Indian Rivers Inter-link
 Inland waterways of India
 Irrigation in India
 Rivers of Jammu and Kashmir
 Sapta Sindhu
 Indus Waters Treaty
 Ranjit Sagar Dam Project
 Ayeyarwady River

Notes

References

External links
 Indian climate change from Harappa period.
 Indus river's transition. 
 
 
 
 

Punjab
Tributaries of the Indus River
Inter-state disputes in India
Rigvedic rivers
Rivers of Jammu and Kashmir
Rivers of Himachal Pradesh
Rivers of Punjab, India
Indus basin
International rivers of Asia
India–Pakistan border
Rivers of Punjab (Pakistan)
Rivers of India
Rivers in Buddhism
Rivers of Pakistan